The Summer Paralympics  also known as the Games of the Paralympiad, are an international multi-sport event where athletes with physical disabilities compete. This includes athletes with mobility disabilities, amputations, blindness, and cerebral palsy. The Paralympic Games are held every four years, organized by the International Paralympic Committee. Medals are awarded in each event, with gold medals for first place, silver for second and bronze for third, a tradition that the Olympic Games started in 1904.

The United States, the United Kingdom and Japan have each hosted the Summer Paralympic Games twice. Other countries that have hosted the summer Paralympics are Australia, Brazil, Canada, China, Greece, Israel, Italy, the Netherlands, South Korea, Spain and West Germany. 

Thirteen countries — Argentina, Australia, Austria, Belgium, France, Great Britain, Ireland, Israel, Italy, Netherlands, Sweden, Switzerland, United States — have been represented at all Summer Paralympic Games. Seven of those countries have won at least one gold medal at every Summer Paralympic Games: Australia, Austria, France, Great Britain, Italy, the Netherlands, and the United States.

The United States has been the top-ranking (medals) nation for eight Paralympic Summer Games: 1964, 1968, 1976, 1980, 1984, 1988, 1992 and 1996. China have been the top-ranking nation for the fifth most recent Games, 2004, 2008, 2012, 2016 and 2020. Italy (1960), West Germany (1972) and Australia (2000) have been the top-ranking nation one time each.

Qualification
Qualification rules for each of the Paralympic sports are set by the International Federation (IF) that governs that sport's international competition.

Historically 

The first official Paralympic Games was held in Rome, Italy, in 1960.  400 athletes from 23 countries competed at the 1960 Games though only athletes in wheelchairs competed.

At the 1976 Summer Games athletes with different disabilities were included for the first time at a summer Paralympics.  With the inclusion of more disability classifications, the 1976 Summer Games expanded to 1,600 athletes from 40 countries.

The 1988 Summer Paralympics were the first to be hosted in the same venues (and thus use the same facilities) as the Olympics of that year. Since then, all Paralympic Games are now held in the same city that hosted the Olympics, with a two-week gap between each.

Rio de Janeiro held the 2016 Summer Paralympics, becoming the first Latin American and South American city to host either the Summer or Winter Games. Tokyo hosted the 2020 Summer Paralympics which made it the first city to host the games twice.

Classification

Every participant at the Paralympics has their disability grouped into one of ten disability categories; impaired muscle power, impaired passive range of movement, limb deficiency, leg length difference, short stature, hypertonia, ataxia, athetosis, vision impairment and intellectual impairment. Each Paralympic sport then has its own classifications, dependent upon the specific physical demands of competition. Events are given a code, made of numbers and letters, describing the type of event and classification of the athletes competing. Some sports, such as athletics, divide athletes by both the category and severity of their disabilities, other sports, for example swimming, group competitors from different categories together, the only separation being based on the severity of the disability. Within the ten disability categories the athletes still need to be divided according to their level of impairment. The classification systems differ from sport to sport, and is intended to even the playing field so as to allow as many athletes to participate as possible. Classifications vary in accordance with the different skills required to perform the sport.

Archery:
Archery is open to athletes with a physical disability. Classifications are broken up into three divisions: W1, spinal cord injured and cerebral palsy athletes with impairment in all four limbs. W2, wheelchair users with full arm function. W3, standing amputee, Les Autres and cerebral palsy standing athletes. Some athletes in the standing group will sit on a high stool for support but will still have their feet touching the ground.

Athletics:
Athletics are open to all disability groups and uses a functional classification system. A brief classification guide is as follows: prefixing F for field athletes or T for track athletes. F or T 11–13 are visually impaired, F or T 20 are learning disabled, F or T 32–38 are cerebral palsy, F or T 40–46 amputee and Les Autres, T 51–54 wheelchair track athletes and F 51–58 wheelchair field athletes.

Basketball:
Basketball is open to wheelchair athletes. Wheelchair athletes are classified according to their physical ability and are given a points rating between 0.5 – 4.5. The individuals who rate at 0.5 are the most severely disabled and those at 4.5 are the least disabled. A team on the court comprises five players and may not exceed a total of 14 points at any given time.

Boccia:
Boccia is open to athletes with cerebral palsy or related neurological conditions who compete from a wheelchair. Classifications are split into four groups; BC1: Athletes are either throwers or foot players (with cerebral palsy). Athletes may compete with an assistant 
BC2: For throwing players (with cerebral palsy). Players may not have an assistant
BC3: Athletes (with severe disability) who use an assistive device and may be assisted by a person, but this assistant must keep their back to the court.
BC4: For throwing players. Players may not have an assistant (non-cerebral palsy).

Cycling:
Cycling is open to amputee, Les Autres, cerebral palsy and visually impaired athletes who compete in the individual road race and track events. Classifications are broken up into divisions 2, 3 and 4.  Athletes in division two are the most severely disabled. While athletes in division four are considered to be higher functioning.  Visually impaired athletes compete together with no separate classification system. They ride in tandem with a sighted guide. Amputee, spinal cord injury and Les Autres competitors compete within the classification groupings LC1 – for riders with upper limb disabilities, LC2 – for riders with disabilities in one leg but who are able to pedal normally, LC3 – essentially for riders with a handicap in one lower limb who will usually pedal with one leg only, and LC4 for riders with disabilities affecting both legs.

Equestrian:
Equestrian is open to all disability groups, with riders divided into four grades. Grade 1 incorporates severely disabled riders with cerebral palsy, Les Autres and spinal cord injury. Grade 2 incorporates cerebral palsy, Les Autres, spinal cord injury and amputee riders with reasonable balance and abdominal control. Grade 3 is for cerebral palsy, Les Autres, amputee, spinal cord injury and totally blind athletes with good balance, leg movement and coordination. Grade 4 incorporates athletes who have cerebral palsy, Les Autres, amputation(s), spinal cord injury and/or are visually impaired. This last group comprises ambulant athletes with either impaired vision or impaired arm/leg function.

Fencing:
Fencing is open to wheelchair athletes. There are only three classes; class A incorporates those athletes with good balance and recovery and full trunk movement; class B is for those with poor balance and recovery but full use of one or both upper limbs; class C is for athletes with severe physical impairment in all four limbs.

Football:
There are two forms of football played at the Paralympics.  The first is 5-a-side football, which is open to visually impaired athletes.  The second is 7-a-side football, which is open to athletes with cerebral palsy.  5-a-side football is open to all visually impaired athletes.  Since there are different levels of visual impairment, all players except the goalie (who acts as a guide) are required to wear eye shades.  The field dimensions are smaller than able-bodied football, there are only five players on the pitch and the ball makes a sound.  Otherwise the rules are exactly the same as able-bodied football.  Athletes competing in 7-a-side football are broken down into classes 5, 6, 7 and 8. All classes comprise ambulant athletes; class 5 being the least physically able, progressing through to class 8 who are minimally affected. Teams must include at least one athlete from either class 5 or 6.  Furthermore, no more than three players from class 8 are allowed to play at the same time.  Other than the fact that the game is played with seven players the rest of the rules and dimensions of the playing field are the same as able-bodied football.

Goalball:
Goalball is open to visually impaired athletes who must wear "black out" masks to ensure all participants can compete equally, thereby eliminating the need for classification.  The ball has a bell in it to help the players react to the ball.  Complete silence at the venue is required so that the athletes can orient themselves and to ensure fairness.

Judo:
Judo is open to visually impaired athletes. The rules are the same as able-bodied judo except that the players are allowed contact with their opponent prior to the start of the match.  There are no classifications; participants are divided into weight categories in the same way as able-bodied judo athletes.

Powerlifting:
Powerlifting is open to athletes with cerebral palsy, spinal cord injuries, amputations (lower limb only), and Les Autres.  Since the competition is a test of upper body strength the classifications are by weight category as in able-bodied powerlifting competition.

Sailing:
Sailing is open to amputee, cerebral palsy, visually impaired, spinal cord injured and Les Autres athletes. There are three events, one for single, double, and triple-crew boats.  Classification for sailing in the three-person event is based on a functional points system with low points for severely disabled athletes rising by scale to high points for less disabled athletes. A classification committee evaluates each sailor and assign a point from one to seven based on their level of ability.  Each crew of three is allowed a maximum of 14 points. The single-person event can be crewed regardless of points but the sailor must have at least a minimum level of disability which prevents them from competing on equal terms with able-bodied sailors.  The two-person event is designed for more severely disabled athletes.

Shooting:
Shooting is open to athletes with a physical disability. There are only two classes of competition, wheelchair and standing.  There are two types of events, pistol and rifle.  The athletes are broken down into classes based on their upper body functionality, balance, muscle strength and limb mobility.  The three classes are SH1-competitors do not require a shooting stand, SH2-competitors cannot support the weight of the gun and require a shooting stand, and SH3-Rifle competitors with a visual impairment.

Swimming:
The Paralympic swimming competition features all four of the strokes used in able-bodied swimming competitions.  Classification is divided into three groups: S1 to S10 are those with physical impairment. S1 will have the most severe impairment and an S10 a lesser impairment. Athletes are judged on their muscle strength, joint range of motion, limb length and movement co-ordination.  S11 to S13 are those with a visual impairment. S11 will have little or no vision, S12 can recognise the shape of a hand and have some ability to see, S13 greater vision than the other two classes but less than 20 degrees of vision. S14 is for athletes with a learning difficulty.

Table Tennis:
Table tennis is open to athletes with a physical disability. There are individual, doubles and team events.  A match is 5 sets of 11 points each.  The athletes are broken down into ten divisions based on their level of function.  Classes 1 to 5 are for athletes competing from a wheelchair with class 1 being the most severely disabled and class 5 the least disabled. Classes 6 to 10 encompass ambulant athletes with class 6 the most severely disabled and class 10 the least.

Tennis:
Tennis at the Paralympics is played with all the same rules as able-bodied tennis with the exception that the ball is allowed to bounce twice, and the first bounce must be within the bounds of the court.  It is open to athletes with a mobility related disability which means that they cannot compete on equal terms with able-bodied tennis players. The game is played from a wheelchair, with two classes, paraplegic (at least one leg must have a permanent and substantial loss of function) and quadriplegic (at least three limbs must have a permanent and substantial loss of function).

Volleyball:
Volleyball is open to athletes with a physical disability and is performed from a seated position. In sitting volleyball the court is smaller than the standard court and has a lower net. In the sitting games the only classification rule is that each team may have only one player who fits the minimum disability rule, which is that their disability prevents them from competing on equal terms with able-bodied athletes.  The other players on the team must demonstrate a higher level of disability.

Wheelchair rugby:
Athletes are classified on a points system similar to wheelchair basketball, with the most severely disabled athlete being graded at 0.5 points rising to 3.5 points. Each team has four players and is allowed a maximum of eight points on the court at any one time.

All-time medal table 

With reference to the top twenty nations and according to official data of the International Paralympic Committee.

Summer Paralympic (1960–2020)

List of Paralympic sports

A number of different sports have been part of the Paralympic program at one point or another.

List of Summer Paralympic Games

Postponed to 2021, due to the COVID-19 pandemic, marking the first time that the Paralympic Games has been postponed. They are still called the 2020 Summer Paralympics, even with the change in scheduling to one year later. The new dates were later confirmed as 24 August to 5 September 2021.

See also
 All-time Paralympic Games medal count
 Cheating at the Paralympic Games
 Winter Paralympic Games
 Multi-sport event
 Summer Olympic Games

Notes

External links
 Official Site of the Paralympic Movement

 

Recurring sporting events established in 1960